Kushk (also Romanized as Kūshk and Kooshk; also known as Keshk, Koshk, Kūshg, and Maḩalleh-ye Kūshk) is a village in Guney-ye Markazi Rural District, in the Central District of Shabestar County, East Azerbaijan Province, Iran. At the 2006 census, its population was 625, in 157 families.

References 

Populated places in Shabestar County